Leslie Dadson MC (6 March 1884 in Sidmouth, Tasmania, Australia - 5 May 1961 in Launceston, Tasmania, Australia) was an Australian soldier.

References

External links
ANZACS Online - Leslie Dadson
Australian War Memorial - Leslie Dadson

1884 births
1961 deaths
Australian military personnel of World War I
Australian recipients of the Military Cross
Recipients of the Military Cross
Australian soldiers
Gallipoli campaign
Military personnel from Tasmania